The Shirts are a New York-based American punk band, which was formed in 1975. The band's early existence (1975 to 1981) was closely linked with CBGB, a music club in the Bowery, but it reformed with many of the early members in 2003 and is currently active.

History

The CBGB years, 1975–1981
The Shirts had their roots in Brooklyn, where Robert Racioppo and Artie Lamonica had been playing together on and off as early as 1970.  Members of the band were gradually added (including lead singer Annie Golden), and guitarist Ronnie Ardito in the next three years. The band got its name when Racioppo, having just broken up his existing band, asserted his desire to form a new one, and his indifference to its name: "call it anything ... shirts ... pants ... shoes ... The Shirts!"  The newly named band, eventually including nine musicians, played covers at small venues in New York until, in 1975, they went to a show at CBGB featuring Patti Smith and were inspired to play there using only their original material.

The Shirts auditioned for CBGB owner Hilly Kristal which resulted in the band being hired, first to open for other bands (including Television and the Talking Heads), then to play as the headliner band. As the band honed their skills and developed new songs, they played at such other local venues as Max's Kansas City.  Like many of the bands championed by Kristal, their sound was actually more pop and dance-oriented than the "art bands" that became famous in association with CBGB.

Although little interest was initially shown in the band by American record labels, The Shirts were featured on a double compilation album featuring the major bands of the CBGB scene in the mid-70s, Live at CBGBs.  However, Nick Mobbs at EMI (who had signed the Sex Pistols to the label) signed the band to EMI's Harvest label in the fall of 1977, and assigned Mike Thorne (who had also worked on Sex Pistols albums) to produce their first album.  Largely for corporate purposes, the band was signed by EMI in conjunction with its US subsidiary label, Capitol Records, which had initially passed on signing the band.  This formality would eventually have a significant impact on the band's early history.

The first album, THE SHIRTS, was recorded in London (while lead singer Golden commuted back to the US to shoot Miloš Forman’s screen version of Hair) and released in 1978, and became popular in Europe. The single "Tell Me Your Plans" charting in the top five in the Netherlands.  The band went on to tour Europe opening for Peter Gabriel, at his request.

Thorne chose to record the band's second album, STREET LIGHT SHINE (1979), at Mediasound Studio in New York City.  The resulting sound was much more eclectic than their debut album, and the album was again a financial and critical success in Europe, the single "Laugh and Walk Away" again charting high in the Netherlands.  However, breakthrough in the US market continued to elude the band.

For the third album, Capitol Records made a deal with EMI in which the band would be signed solely to Capitol.  Now under Capitol's management rather than Thorne's, recording went poorly and the resulting album, INNER SLEEVE (1980), was not properly supported by the label, only 10,000 copies being pressed.  It was a signal failure for the band, and although they continued playing for another two years, the large band (nine members at its height) had been reduced to four players, and essentially broke up in 1981.

Reunions and reformation, 1994 to present
The band members, some of whom had stayed in the music business, reunited twice in the 1990s to play benefits for CBGB, which periodically suffered tax issues.  Efforts were made to reform the band, which included early auditions with Golden, who had established a career in film, TV and on stage ("Orange Is The New Black"), and two other female singers, Caren Messing and Kathy McCloskey, who had worked with Racioppo in another band.  Golden ultimately decided not to join the reformed band, and Messing and McCloskey together took the female lead.  The reformed band first played for the public at CBGB in May 2003, and continue to perform periodically.

In 2006, The Shirts recorded and released their first album in over 25 years at the studio Thorne had opened. It was titled, ONLY THE DEAD KNOW BROOKLYN.  In 2010, The Shirts released THE TIGER MUST JUMP on Rottentoof Records.

As of 2014, both Racioppo and Lamonica have spin off projects. Racioppo formed 'Bob of The Shirts', with Bob on bass, John Amato on guitars and keyboards, James Rosenthal on guitars and Beth Arielle on drums.  They released their first album, TOWNIE, on Rottentotoof Records. Artie Lamonica formed 'Rome 56', whose recordings are online.

Discography

Albums
The Shirts (1978)
Street Light Shine (1979)
Inner Sleeve (1980)
Only the Dead Know Brooklyn (2006)
The Tiger Must Jump (2010) 
Bob of The Shirts – Townie (2014)

Singles
 "Tell Me Your Plans" b/w "Cyrinda" (1978) UK : Harvest Records HAR 5165
 "Running Through the Night" b/w "Lonely Android" (1978) UK : Harvest Records HAR 5170
 "Reduced to a Whisper" b/w "The Story Goes" (1978) NL : Harvest Records 5C 006-06910
 "Out on the Ropes" b/w "Maybe, Maybe Not" (1979) UK : Harvest Records HAR 5190
 "Can't Cry Anymore" b/w "I'm in Love Again" (1979) USA : Capitol Records 4750
 "Laugh and Walk Away" b/w "Triangulum" (1980) UK : Harvest Records HAR 5195
 "One Last Chance" b/w "Too Much Trouble" (1980) UK : Capitol Records CL 16161

References

Musical groups established in 1975
Musical groups from New York City
American power pop groups
Capitol Records artists
Harvest Records artists